Newport Harbor: The Real Orange County (or simply Newport Harbor) is an MTV reality television series, documenting the lives of several teenagers of affluent families in Newport Harbor, a seaside community located in Orange County, California, United States. It differs from the usual reality show in that it is structured as a traditional narrative (seen more commonly in fictionalized television dramas or soap operas) than a straightforward observant documentary style.

The series premiered on August 13, 2007, and concluded on January 2, 2008. The series was created as a successor to Laguna Beach: The Real Orange County to avoid cancelling the series for lack of a fourth season plotline. However, Newport Harbor proved to be unsuccessful and was cancelled after two seasons.

Development
Laguna Beach: The Real Orange County was initially developed as a documentary of teens living in the wealthy, beachside community of the same name. The first two seasons were successful, which led to the creation of the spin-off, The Hills, though the third season's ratings took a massive dip after the original cast left the series and was replaced by a set of current high school students.

With a lack of interest in casting for the fourth season, MTV and the producers considered relocating, scouting numerous other wealthy Southern California towns, including San Marino, Anaheim Hills, Rancho Santa Fe, and Malibu before deciding to base the show in Newport Harbor, an area of the city of Newport Beach. This series was labeled a "love story show", since it seemed most of the series was based around Chrissy Schwartz and Clay Adler.

MTV decided to pull the plug on Newport Harbor due to under-performance of ratings. The show was officially cancelled on January 2, 2008.

Cast

Main
Chrissy Schwartz
Clay Adler
Allie Stockton
Grant Newman
Sasha Dunlap
Chase Cornwell
Taylor Geiney

Supporting
Samantha Kuhns, Allie's friend
Steve & Linda Schwartz, Chrissy's dad & mom
Art & Carolyn Stockton, Allie's dad & mom
Courtney Briglio, Chrissy & Sasha's friend
Jasen Ruiz, Clay & Grant's friend
Andrew Skjonsby, Clay & Grant's friend
Matt "Krutch" Kretschmar, Chase's friend
Kylie Cusick & Allie, Chrissy's sorority sisters
Billy Hahn, Chrissy's friend

Episodes

Series overview

Season 1 (2007) 
Filmed from February to August of 2007.

Season 2: Home for the Holidays (2007–08) 
Filmed from November to December of 2007.

Home media
The website Amazon.com had struck a deal with many companies to produce DVDs of certain shows, through the CreateSpace service. Using a concept similar to print on demand, Amazon made the discs, cover art, and disc art themselves. The complete series was released on Amazon's website on August 29, 2008, in a three disc set. Both seasons are also available for digital download on iTunes.

See also
 Newport Beach, California
 The City
 Living on the Edge
 The O.C.
 Baldwin Hills
 Freshwater Blue

References

External links
 Newport Harbor: The Real Orange County at the Internet Movie Database
 Newport Harbor: The Real Orange County at TV.com 
 The Real Orange County at theRealOC.com

2007 American television series debuts
2008 American television series endings
2000s American reality television series
American television spin-offs
English-language television shows
MTV reality television series
Television series about teenagers
Television shows set in Newport Beach, California